An outdoor 2007 bronze sculpture of Martin Luther King Jr. by American artist Ed Dwight is installed in Hermann Park's McGovern Centennial Gardens in Houston, Texas, United States. The sculpture was vandalized with white paint in August 2017. John D. Harden, Margaret Kadifa, Mike Morris, and Brooke A. Lewis of the Houston Chronicle noted that the vandalism occurred around the same time that protesters demanded the removal of Confederate monuments and memorials in Houston, and the same day that the city's statue of Christopher Columbus was vandalized with red paint.

See also
 2007 in art
 Civil rights movement in popular culture
 Dr. Martin Luther King Jr. (Blome sculpture), Milwaukee, Wisconsin
 Martin Luther King Jr. (Wilson sculpture), Washington, D.C.
 List of public art in Houston
 Statue of Martin Luther King Jr. (Austin, Texas)

References

2007 establishments in Texas
2007 sculptures
Bronze sculptures in Texas
Hermann Park
Memorials to Martin Luther King Jr.
Monuments and memorials in Texas
Outdoor sculptures in Houston
Sculptures of men in Texas
Statues in Houston
Sculptures of Martin Luther King Jr.
Vandalized works of art in Texas
Sculptures by Ed Dwight